Charles John Phipps  (25 March 1835 – 25 May 1897) was an English architect known for more than 50 theatres he designed in the latter half of the 19th century, including several important ones in London. He is noted for his design of the Theatre Royal, Exeter, which caught fire in 1887, killing 186 visitors.

Biography
Born in Bath, Phipps married Honnor Hicks on 10 April 1860. The couple had two sons and three daughters.

Phipps's first major work was the rebuilding of Theatre Royal, Bath in 1862/3, after the old theatre had been destroyed by fire. Moving to London, he quickly established himself as the leading theatrical architect, building, in rapid succession, the Queen's Theatre (1867), the Gaiety Theatre (1868), the Olympic Theatre (1870) and the Vaudeville Theatre (1871). His early work, especially the Gaiety, inspired a young Frank Matcham, who was impressed at Phipps's ability to build a normal-sized theatre on a small, awkward plot.

Phipps designed the Gaiety Theatre, Dublin for John and Michael Gunn, opened in November 1871. Phipps's Savoy Theatre (1881), a state-of-the-art facility, was the first public building in the world lit entirely by electric light. Other major London theatres included the Strand (1882), the Prince's (1884), the Lyric (1888), the original Shaftesbury Theatre (1888), the Garrick (1889), the Tivoli (1890), Daly's (1893) and Her Majesty's Theatre (1897).

In addition to Phipps's London theatres, he was responsible for over forty theatres in the provinces. He also designed Leinster Hall in Dublin for Michael Gunn (opened in 1886 and closed in 1895), the Star and Garter Hotel at Richmond (demolished in 1919) and the Savoy Turkish Bath. Phipps was chosen to design the Royal Institute of British Architects’ own premises at 9 Conduit Street. The building is still there, though no longer occupied by the RIBA (now in Portland Place) and is considered by some to reflect the influence of the architect's native town. He was a fellow (1866) of the Royal Institute of British Architects, serving on its council in 1875–6, and also of the Society of Antiquaries.

Phipps died on 25 May 1897, aged 62, and is buried in a family grave on the east side of Highgate Cemetery.

Blame for deaths at Exeter fire

Phipps designed the Theatre Royal, Exeter, which opened in 1886. In 1887, during a performance, a gauze curtain caught fire from a gas lamp lighting the stage. The resulting fire claimed the lives of 186 visitors and remains the worst theatre-related disaster, and third most deadly fire in UK history. There were two inquiries into the disaster, both of which placed significant blame on Phipps:

A coroner's inquest was opened on 21 September 1887 before a coroner's jury. The magistrates who issued the premises licence had noted only a single exit from the gallery (where the majority of the deaths occurred) where there should have been two, but Phipps persuaded them that people climbing the railing at the front of the balcony and dropping to the Upper Circle below was a suitable and effective second exit. The verdict was of accidental death, but the coroner's jury found that the magistrates had been misled by Phipps and suggested that a licence should never have been issued. The coroner's jury noted that a safety curtain and fire hydrant were specified in the theatre's plans, but had not yet been installed in the building. They also criticised the lack of ceiling height above the gallery, which gave people less time to escape before being overcome by smoke.

A separate parliamentary inquiry was carried out by Captain Eyre Massey Shaw, the Chief Officer of the Metropolitan Fire Brigade. Shaw's report was also critical of Phipps and his design. Phipps attended the inquest and was "vigorous" and "sarcastic" in his defence of his work, pointing out that a number of elements in his plans had been changed or ignored during construction. The jury in this case also returned a verdict of accidental death. Ultimately, Shaw was able to use the results of the fire to bring about stricter theatre regulations, including the requirement for a safety curtain.

Theatres
Among the theatres Phipps designed, or co-designed, are:
 Theatre Royal, Bath (1862/3)
 Theatre Royal, Nottingham (1865)
 Theatre Royal, Brighton (1866)
 Queen's Theatre, Long Acre (1867)
 Prince's Theatre, Bristol (1867)
 Gaiety Theatre, London (1868)
 Olympic Theatre (1870)
 Varieties Music Hall, Hoxton (1870), demolished c. 1980
 Vaudeville Theatre, London (1871)
 Gaiety Theatre, Dublin (1871)
 Tivoli Theatre, Aberdeen (1872)
 Theatre Royal, Glasgow (1880 and 1895), the largest surviving example of his work
 Theatre Royal, Belfast (1881), demolished 1961
 Savoy Theatre, London (1881), rebuilt 1929
 Royal Strand Theatre (1882) demolished 1905
 Royal Lyceum Theatre, Edinburgh (1883)
 Royal Hippodrome Theatre (originally Theatre Royal and Opera House), Eastbourne (1883)
 Prince's Theatre, London (1884) also known as the Prince of Wales Theatre; demolished 1934
 Royal Theatre, Northampton (1884)
 Theatre Royal, Portsmouth (1884)
 Theatre Royal, Exeter (1886)
 Lyric Theatre, London (1888)
 Original Shaftesbury Theatre (1888)
 Garrick Theatre, London, with Walter Emden (1889)
 Tivoli Theatre of Varieties, London (1890), demolished 1957
 Queen's Hall (1893), preliminary designs only, bombed in 1941
 Daly's Theatre (1893), demolished
 Grand Theatre, Wolverhampton (1894)
 Toole's Theatre (1895), never built
 Her Majesty's Theatre, London (1897)

Gallery of architectural work

References

Attribution

Sources
Guide to British Theatres 1750–1950, John Earl and Michael Sell pp. 279–82 (Theatres Trust, 2000)

External links
University of Bristol Theatre Collection, University of Bristol

English theatre architects
1835 births
1897 deaths
Burials at Highgate Cemetery
Architects from Bath, Somerset

19th-century English architects